USS Clarence L. Evans (DE-113) was a  built for the United States Navy during World War II.  She served in the Atlantic Ocean and provided escort service against submarine and air attack for Navy vessels and convoys.
She was launched on 22 March 1944 by Dravo Corporation, Wilmington, Delaware, sponsored by Mrs. E. E. Evans; commissioned on 25 June 1944 and reported to the Atlantic Fleet.

Namesake
Clarence Lee Evans was born on 27 April 1923 at Saginaw, Missouri. He enlisted in the United States Marine Corps Reserve on 31 May 1941.

After training at San Diego, California, Evans served in the field from 20 January 1942 until 25 November 1942, when he was killed in action in the Guadalcanal Campaign. He was awarded the Navy Cross for extraordinary heroism in capturing two enemy machine gun nests two days before his death.

History

World War II North Atlantic operations
Clarence L. Evans reported at Norfolk, Virginia, on 2 September 1944 for duty in training precommissioning crews of other escort vessels. Here she conducted tests of newly developed 3-inch ammunition and acoustic torpedo defense equipment.

On 19 October she cleared Norfolk, Virginia, for the first of five convoy crossings from New York City to Glasgow, Southampton, Plymouth, and Le Havre. These trips, which averaged about 30 days for each voyage, were alternated with training duties at New London, Connecticut, or Casco Bay.
 
On 29 May 1945, Clarence L. Evans put into Brooklyn for overhaul until 22 June. She then reported to Naval Air Station Quonset Point for duty as plane guard during carrier qualification exercises. She cleared Narragansett Bay on 17 August for Miami, Florida, assumed plane guard duty until 2 October, then cleared for Brooklyn, New York, and overhaul.

Post-war decommissioning 
Clarence L. Evans reported to Green Cove Springs, Florida, on 10 November, where she was placed out of commission in reserve on 29 May 1947. She was lent to France under the Military Assistance Program on 29 March 1952. The ship was given the name Berbère by the French Navy and bore the Pennant number F 723. Berbère was stricken in 1960.

See also
List of Escorteurs of the French Navy

References

External links
 

Cannon-class destroyer escorts of the United States Navy
Ships built in Wilmington, Delaware
1944 ships
World War II frigates and destroyer escorts of the United States
Ships built by Dravo Corporation